The 2017 Cape Town Summer Series was the second edition of the women's field hockey friendly series, comprising a number of test matches between the national teams of Belgium, Chile, China, England and the hosts, South Africa. The series was held at Hartleyvale Stadium in Cape Town, from 20 January to 26 February.

England finished in first place, topping the pool at the conclusion of the matches.

Results
All times are local (SAST).

Standings

Fixtures

Goalscorers

References

Cape Town Summer Series
Cape Town Summer Series
Cape Town Summer Series
Cape Town Summer Series
International women's field hockey competitions hosted by South Africa
2010s in Cape Town
Sports competitions in Cape Town